Joseph Daniel Sullivan (January 6, 1870 in Charlestown, Massachusetts – November 2, 1897 in Charlestown, Massachusetts) was a shortstop in Major League Baseball from  to . He played for the Washington Senators, Philadelphia Phillies, and St. Louis Browns.

External links

1870 births
1897 deaths
Major League Baseball shortstops
Washington Senators (1891–1899) players
Philadelphia Phillies players
St. Louis Browns (NL) players
19th-century baseball players
Baseball players from Massachusetts